Lê Quang Cường (born 2 January 1983) is a Vietnamese footballer who plays for SHB Đà Nẵng. He played for Vietnamese international at the 2008 AFF Suzuki Cup.

Honors 
SHB Đà Nẵng:
V-League: 2009, 2012
Vietnam:
ASEAN Football Championship: 2008

References 

1983 births
Living people
Vietnamese footballers
Association football defenders
Vietnam international footballers